Harbor Freeway station (formerly Harbor Freeway/I-105 station) is a transport hub located on the Harbor Transitway, within the Judge Harry Pregerson Interchange of  Interstate 105 and Interstate 110 near Figueroa Street in the neighborhood of South Los Angeles. The station is served by the light rail C Line, the bus rapid transit J Line and other bus services. The station is owned by the California Department of Transportation (Caltrans) and operated by the Los Angeles County Metropolitan Transportation Authority (Metro).

Service

Station layout 
The station has three levels: the upper level provides access to the C Line, the middle level has the connections to local bus services and the 253 space park and ride lot, and the lower level provides access to the J Line and other express buses operating on the Harbor Transitway. It is located near the Athens district of Los Angeles.

Hours and frequency

Other Harbor Transitway services 
These routes stop at the same boarding platforms of the Metro J Line at the freeway level:
 Los Angeles Metro Bus: Express  
 Dodger Stadium Express 
 GTrans (Gardena): 1X 
 LADOT Commuter Express:

Connections 
These non-Harbor Transitway routes stop on the west side of Figueroa Street:
 GTrans (Gardena): 1X 
 Torrance Transit: 1

History 
The site is approximately the former Forest (later South Los Angeles) station on the San Pedro via Gardena Line of the Pacific Electric. It was also the southern terminus of the Los Angeles Railway 7 Line, allowing interchanges between the two systems. Pacific Electric service ended in 1940, while the 7 Line ran until 1955.

Incidents 

On February 22, 2012, a drunk driver on the Harbor Freeway mistakenly entered the bus-only station area of the Harbor Freeway station. The driver, 51-year-old Stephen L. Lubin of Sun Valley, was traveling  in his 2009 Honda Fit ( over the freeway's posted speed limit) as he entered the station and encountered a bus stopped at the platform. Lubin swerved to avoid hitting the bus and drove onto the station platform where he hit seven people, critically injuring six, before slamming into a pole on the platform.

After the crash, Metro's CEO Art Leahy asked Metro's safety committee staff to review the layout of busway stations and safety signage on the roadways leading into the station areas. As a result of that investigation, Metro added concrete-filled metal bollards to all stations on the Harbor Transitway and the El Monte Busway to prevent vehicles from entering the platform and additional markings were added on roadways leading into stations.

References 

C Line (Los Angeles Metro) stations
Los Angeles Metro Busway stations
South Los Angeles
J Line (Los Angeles Metro)
Railway stations in the United States opened in 1995
1995 establishments in California
Bus stations in Los Angeles